The Bhagat Ki Kothi–Ahmedabad Weekly Express is an Express train belonging to North Western Railway zone that runs between  and  in India. It is currently being operated with 14803/14804 train numbers on a weekly basis.

Service

The 14803/Bhagat Ki Kothi–Ahmedabad Weekly Express has an average speed of 50 km/hr and covers 481 km in 9h 35m . The 14804/Ahmedabad–Bhagat Ki Kothi Weekly Express has an average speed of 48 km/hr and covers 481 km in 10h.

Schedule

Route and halts 

The important halts of the train are:

Coach composition

The train has standard ICF rakes with max speed of 110 kmph. The train consists of 18 coaches:

 1 AC II Tier
 2 AC III Tier
 7 Sleeper coaches
 6 General Unreserved
 2 Seating cum Luggage Rake

Traction

Both trains are hauled by a Bhagat Ki Kothi Loco Shed-based WDP-4D diesel locomotive from Bhagat Ki Kothi to Ahmedabad and vice versa.

Direction reversal

The train reverses its direction 1 times:

Rake sharing

04817/04818–04817/Bhagat Ki Kothi–Bandra Terminus Special Fare Special (via Bhildi)

See also 

 Bhagat Ki Kothi railway station
 Ahmedabad Junction railway station

Notes

References

External links 

 14803/Bhagat Ki Kothi–Ahmedabad Weekly Express India Rail Info
 14804/Ahmedabad–Bhagat Ki Kothi Weekly Express India Rail Info

Transport in Jodhpur
Transport in Ahmedabad
Express trains in India
Rail transport in Gujarat
Rail transport in Rajasthan
Railway services introduced in 2014